Cymindis arctica is a species of ground beetle in the subfamily Harpalinae. It was described by Kryzhanovskij & Emetz in 1979.

References

arctica
Beetles described in 1979